Mokhovskoy is a rural locality (a khutor) in Saltynskoye Rural Settlement, Uryupinsky District, Volgograd Oblast, Russia. The population was 225 as of 2010. There are 10 streets.

Geography 
Mokhovskoy is located in steppe, 32 km north of Uryupinsk (the district's administrative centre) by road. Firsovsky is the nearest rural locality.

References 

Rural localities in Uryupinsky District